County Sligo is a county in Ireland. It is located in the Border Region and is part of the province of Connacht. Sligo is the administrative capital and largest town in the county. Sligo County Council is the local authority for the county. The population of the county was 65,535 at the 2016 census. It is noted for Benbulben Mountain, one of Ireland's most distinctive natural landmarks.

History

The county was officially formed in 1585 by Sir Henry Sidney, Lord Deputy of Ireland, but did not come into effect until the chaos of the Nine Years' War ended, in 1603. Its boundaries reflect the Ó Conchobhair Sligigh confederation of Lower Connacht as it was at the time of the Elizabethan conquest.

This confederation consisted of the tuatha, or territories, of Cairbre Drumcliabh, Tír Fhíacrach Múaidhe, Tír Ollíol, Luíghne, Corann and Cúl ó bhFionn. Under the system of surrender and regrant each tuath was subsequently made into an English barony: Carbury, Tireragh, Tirerril, Leyny, Corran and Coolavin. The capital of the newly shired county was placed at Sligo.

A causewayed enclosure discovered in 2003 at Maugheraboy is one of the earliest indications of Neolithic farming activity on the Cúil Irra Peninsula. The nearby megalithic cemetery of Carrowmore forms part of a huge complex of Stone Age remains connecting Carrowkeel in south Sligo to the Ox Mountains, to the Cuil Irra Peninsula, where the passage tomb named after the legendary Queen Maeve, Miosgán Médhbh, dominates the western skyline from the crest of Knocknarea Mountain.

The Caves of Kesh, famous in Irish mythology, are in south County Sligo. A recent decoding of the work of Marinus of Tyre and Ptolemy shows Sligo as the likely location of Nagnata, an important place of assembly in the Iron Age. Famous medieval manuscripts written in the area include the Book of Ballymote, written in the territory of Corran, the Great Book of Lecan, and the Yellow Book of Lecan, both written in Tir Fhiacrach. The patron of the Annals of the Four Masters was Fearghal Ó Gadhra of Coolavin in south County Sligo.

Local government and politics

Sligo County Council is the governing body for the county. At the 2019 Sligo County Council election, it was divided into three local electoral areas (LEAs): Ballymote–Tobercurry (7 seats), Sligo–Strandhill (6 seats), and Sligo–Drumcliff (5 seats). Each of these form a municipal district, with the containing Sligo–Strandhill known as the borough district of Sligo.

Former districts
Under the Local Government (Ireland) Act 1898, County Sligo was divided into the rural districts of Boyle No. 2, Dromore West, Sligo, and Tobercurry, and the urban district of Sligo. Unlike most urban districts, Sligo had retained its borough corporation. The rural districts were abolished in 1925. Sligo Borough Corporation became a borough council in 2002, before being abolished in 2014 in common with all borough and town councils in Ireland.

National politics
County Sligo is part of the Dáil constituency of Sligo–Leitrim (4 TDs). At the 2020 election, Martin Kenny (Sinn Féin), Frank Feighan (Fine Gael), Marc MacSharry (Fianna Fáil) and Marian Harkin (Ind) were elected.

Coat of arms
This coat of arms was adopted by Sligo County Council in 1980. The design on the black shield, which shows an open book on which there is a Celtic Cross and a red rose, represents collectively the literary and cultural history of Sligo. These refer to such early works as the Books of Ballymote and Lecan, while the rose was a significant theme in the poetry of W.B.Yeats. The escallop shells sprinkled on the shield refer to the origin of the word Sligeach – "a place abounding in shells". The boar's head refers to the "wild boar of Benbulben" in the Diarmuid and Gráinne myth. The colour scheme of the crest incorporates the Sligo GAA colours of black and white.

Culture

County Sligo is the setting for a large number of the texts in the Mythological Cycles. The story of Diarmad and Grainne has its final act played out on Ben Bulben. The Second Battle of Moytirra is associated with Moytirra in South County Sligo. Other texts include Bruidean Ceise Corann, set on Keash Mountain. The rich array of megalithic monuments in the area has been an inspiration to artists and writers such as Sir Samuel Ferguson. The poet and Nobel laureate William Butler Yeats (1865–1939) spent much of his childhood in northern Sligo and the county's landscapes (particularly the Isle of Innisfree, in Lough Gill) were the inspiration for much of his poetry.  Yeats said, "the place that has really influenced my life most is Sligo."  He is buried in North County Sligo, "Under Ben Bulben", in Drumcliff. William Yeats' brother Jack, a painter, also was inspired by the Sligo landscape.

Music
County Sligo has a long history of traditional music. The south of the county is particularly noted with such musical luminaries as James Morrison, Michael Coleman, Paddy Killoran, Fred Finn, Peter Horan, Joe O'Dowd, Jim Donoghue, Martin Wynne, Oisín Mac Diarmada (of Téada), tin-whistle player Carmel Gunning and the band Dervish. The county has many traditional music festivals and one of the most well-known is the Queen Maeve International Summer School, a traditional Irish Music summer school of music and dance which is held annually in August in Sligo Town. On the more contemporary music scene there are Westlife, Tabby Callaghan and The Conway Sisters who are from Sligo. Strandhill, about 9 km west of Sligo, hosts the Strandhill Guitar Festival each year, featuring a wide variety of guitar music and musicians.

Sport
The county is home to League of Ireland Premier Division club Sligo Rovers, who have played home matches at The Showgrounds since they were founded in 1928 and won the league on 3 occasions. Their colours are red and white, hence their nickname the 'Bit 'O' Red'. Brother Walfrid, the founder of Celtic Football Club, was born in Ballymote, in the south of the county.

The county is represented in Gaelic Games by Sligo GAA. Their colours are black and white. Sligo has won the Connacht Championship 3 times.

Geography and subdivisions

Sligo is the 22nd largest of Ireland's 32 counties in area and the 26th largest in terms of population. It is the fourth largest of Connacht's 5 counties in size and third largest in terms of population. The County borders County Mayo to the west, County Roscommon to the south and south-east and County Leitrim to the northeast.

Largest towns in County Sligo (2016 Census)

Sligo, 19,452
Tubbercurry, 1,986
Strandhill, 1,753
Collooney, 1,610
Ballymote, 1,549
Ballisodare, 1,350
Enniscrone, 1,223
Coolaney, 990
Rosses Point, 883
Grange, 586

Towns and villages

Achonry
Aclare
Ballaghnatrillick
Ballinafad
Ballygawley
Ballintogher
Ballymote
Ballynacarrow
Ballysadare
Beltra
Bunninadden
Carney
Castlebaldwin
Cliffony
Cloonacool
Collooney
Coolaney
Dromore West
Drumcliff
Easky
Enniscrone
Geevagh
Grange
Gorteen
Kilglass
Monasteraden
Mullaghmore
Riverstown
Rosses Point
Skreen
Strandhill
Toorlestraun
Tubbercurry

Places of interest 

Benbulbin
Carrowkeel Megalithic Cemetery
Carrowmore Megalithic Cemetery
Caves of Kesh
Coolera Peninsula
Curlew Mountains
Dartry Mountains
Easkey Bog
Glencar Lough
Knocknarea
Lough Arrow
Lough Gill
Maugherow Peninsula
Mullaghmore Peninsula
Ox Mountains
Rosses Point Peninsula
Sligo Abbey
Sruth in Aghaidh an Aird

People

 FeldmarschallThe 3rd Earl of Carlingford (1639–1704) – a very senior-ranking military commander for the Habsburg monarchy in the Holy Roman Empire (or the Austrian Empire). Lord Carlingford was born in Ballymote and served for many years as the chief minister of the Duchy of Lorraine.
 El Marqués de Osorno (1720-1801) – Spanish colonial administrator
 Owen Connellan (1797-1871) – Irish Scholar, translated the Annals of the Four Masters in 1846.
 George Stokes (1819-1903) – mathematician, physicist
 Lola Montez (1821-1861) – dancer, actress
 Michael Corcoran (1827-1863) – Union Army general in the American Civil War
 Brother Walfrid (1840-1915) – founder of Celtic FC
 William Butler Yeats (1865-1939) – poet
 Constance Markievicz (1868–1927) – revolutionary Irish nationalist, the first woman elected to the British Parliament
 Jack Butler Yeats (1871-1957) – Artist
 Martin Moffat (1882-1946) - soldier, recipient of the Victoria Cross
 Michael Coleman (1891-1945) – traditional music
 James Morrison (1893-1947) – traditional music
 Martin Savage (1897-1917) – Irish republican
 Nace O'Dowd (1931-1987) - Gaelic football captain for the Sligo county team
 Mary O'Hara (born 1935) – singer
 Ray McSharry (born 1938) – Fianna Fáil Teachta Dála (TD) for the Sligo–Leitrim constituency from 1969 to 1988; Tánaiste. He also served as Member of the European Parliament (MEP) for the Connacht–Ulster constituency. 
 Scott Fredericks (1943–2017) - actor
 Neil Jordan (born 1950) – film director, screenwriter, novelist and short-story writer
 Marian Harkin (born 1953) – Teachta Dála (TD) for the Sligo–Leitrim constituency; previously a Member of the European Parliament (MEP) from 2004 to 2019.
 Pauline McLynn (born 1962) – actress; Mrs Doyle in the sitcom Father Ted
Christopher O’Donnell (born 1998) - Olympic track and field athlete
 Tommy Fleming (born 1971) – singer
 Shane Filan (born 1979) – a member of the pop band Westlife
 Kian Egan (born 1980) – a member of the pop band Westlife
 Mark Feehily (born 1980) – a member of the pop band Westlife

Railways
The Dublin–Sligo railway line is operated by Iarnród Éireann in Ireland. It starts in Dublin Connolly station, terminating at Sligo Mac Diarmada railway station in Sligo. In the county there are stations at Ballymote and Collooney.

See also

High Sheriff of Sligo
List of abbeys and priories in the Republic of Ireland (County Sligo)
List of people from Sligo
Sligo GAA
Sligo Rovers F.C.
Sligo (Town)
Wild Atlantic Way

References

External links

Collection of Sligo Landscape Photographs
Sligo County Council
Sligo Borough Council
Map of Sligo
Sligoheritage.com
History of Sligo, County and Town By William Gregory Wood-Martin
 Song, "Beautiful Sligo" sung by Michael McGloin,YouTube Video, with images.

 
Sligo
Sligo
Sligo